The Eastern Air Defense Force (EADF) is an inactive United States Air Force organization.  Its last assignment was with Air Defense Command being stationed at Stewart Air Force Base, New York. It was inactivated on July 1, 1960.

History
EADF was an intermediate-level command and control organization of Air Defense Command.  Its origins date to 1 March 1949 when Continental Air Command (ConAC) reorganized Air Defense Command when it became an operating agency. Air defense units within the Continental United States (CONUS) were given to the Eastern and Western Air Defense Liaison Groups, with Western and Eastern Air Defense Forces activated on 1 September 1949.

The command was originally assigned the region within the Continental United States (CONUS) to the east of the 102d degree of longitude, along the Canada–US border to the most easternmost point of Maine; the southern boundary being the 102d degree of longitude along the Rio Grande boundary with Mexico, east to the southernmost point of Texas and along the Gulf of Mexico and Atlantic Ocean coastlines.

This was adjusted in 1951 with the activation of Central Air Defense Force (CADF) with the region being adjusted to the area east of the 90th degree of longitude south to the point of the Missouri, Kentucky and Tennessee state boundaries, and eastward to the Atlantic Ocean coastline along the Tennessee/Kentucky and Virginia/North Carolina border, with all areas north and east of those boundaries. Organizations stationed west and south of that delineation were transferred to CADF.

The delineation was again adjusted in March 1956 to the region generally to the east of the 90th degree of longitude south to the point of the Missouri, Kentucky and Tennessee state boundaries, then south along the Mississippi river to the Gulf of Mexico in the south. CADF organizations in the southeast were reassigned to the EADF.

Eastern Air Defense Force was inactivated on 1 July 1960, with its assigned units reassigned either to 26th, 30th or 32d Air Divisions, or to the new Air Defense Sectors created with the advent of the Semi Automatic Ground Environment (SAGE) system.

Lineage
Established as Eastern Air Defense Force and organized September 1, 1949.
 Discontinued July 1, 1960

Assignments
Continental Air Command, September 1, 1949 – January 1, 1951
Air Defense Command, January 1, 1951 – July 1, 1960

Stations
Mitchel Air Force Base, New York, September 1, 1949 – August 1, 1950
Stewart Air Force Base, New York, August 1, 1950 – July 1, 1960

Components

Air Divisions

26th Air Division
 Stationed at Roslyn Air Force Station, New York
 Re-assigned to Eastern Air Defense Force, 1 September 1950 from First Air Force
 Re-designated 26th Air Division (SAGE), 8 August 1958
 Moved to Syracuse Air Force Station, New York, 8 August 1958
 Re-assigned to Air Defense Command, 1 August 1959

30th Air Division
 Stationed at Willow Run Air Force Station, Michigan
 Re-assigned to Eastern Air Defense Force 1 April 1959 from Air Defense Command
 Re-designated 30th Air Division (SAGE), 1 April 1959
 Moved to Truax Field, Wisconsin, 1 April 1959
 Re-assigned to Air Defense Command, 1 July 1959

31st Air Division
 Activated at Selfridge Air Force Base, Michigan, 8 October 1950
 Assigned to Eastern Air Defense Force
 Re-assigned to Air Defense Command, 1 January 1951

32d Air Division
 Activated at Stewart Air Force Base, New York, 1 January 1951
 Assigned to Eastern Air Defense Force
 Moved to Syracuse Air Force Station, New York, 1 December 1953
 Re-designated 32d Air Division (Defense), 15 August 1958
 Re-designated 32d Air Division (SAGE), 15 November 1958
 Moved to Dobbins Air Force Base, Georgia, 15 November 1958
 Re-assigned to Air Defense Command, 1 August 1959

33d Air Division (Defense)
 Activated at Tinker Air Force Base, Oklahoma, 19 March 1951
 Assigned to Eastern Air Defense Force
 Re-assigned to Central Air Defense Force (CADF), 20 May 1951

35th Air Division
 Stationed at Dobbins Air Force Base, Georgia
 Re-assigned to Eastern Air Defense Force, 10 April 1955 from Central Air Defense Force, 10 April 1955
 Inactivated 15 November 1958

37th Air Division
 Stationed at Truax Field, Wisconsin
 Re-assigned to Eastern Air Defense Force 8 September 1955 from Air Defense Command
 Inactivated 1 April 1959

58th Air Division
 Activated at Wright-Patterson Air Force Base, Ohio, 8 September 1955
 Assigned to Eastern Air Defense Force
 Inactivated 1 February 1959

85th Air Division
 Activated at Andrews Air Force Base, Maryland, 8 September 1955
 Assigned to Eastern Air Defense Force
 Inactivated 1 September 1958

Wings

23d Fighter-Interceptor Wing
 Activated at Presque Isle Air Force Base, Maine, 1 January 1951
 Assigned to Eastern Air Defense Force
 Inactivated 6 February 1952

33d Fighter Wing (Air Defense)
 Stationed at Otis Air Force Base, Massachusetts
 Re-assigned to Eastern Air Defense Force 1 January 1951 from Air Defense Command
 Inactivated 6 February 1952

52d Fighter-Interceptor Wing
 Stationed at McGuire Air Force Base, New Jersey as 52d Fighter All-Weather Wing
 Re-assigned to Eastern Air Defense Force 1 January 1951 from Air Defense Command
 Re-designated 52d Fighter-Interceptor Wing, 1 May 1951
 Inactivated 6 February 1952

56th Fighter-Interceptor Wing
 Stationed at Selfridge Air Force Base, Michigan
 Re-assigned to Eastern Air Defense Force 1 January 1951 from Air Defense Command
 Inactivated 6 February 1952

101st Fighter-Interceptor Wing
 Federalized Maine Air National Guard, 10 February 1951
 Stationed at Dow Air Force Base, Maine
 Moved to Grenier Air Force Base, New Hampshire, 1 May 1951
 Moved to Larson Air Force Base, Washington and re-assigned to Western Air Defense Force (WADF), 2 August 1951

103d Fighter-Interceptor Wing
 Federalized Connecticut Air National Guard, 2 March 1951
 Stationed at Brainard Field, Connecticut
 Moved to Suffolk County Air Force Base, New York, 1 June 1951
 Inactivated and returned to state control, 6 February 1952

122d Fighter-Interceptor Wing
 Federalized Indiana Air National Guard, 10 February 1951
 Stationed at Stout Field, Indiana
 Moved to Baer Field, Indiana, 1 May 1951
 Re-assigned to Central Air Defense Force (CADF), 1 December 1951

128th Fighter-Interceptor Wing
 Federalized Wisconsin Air National Guard, 10 February 1951
 Stationed at General Mitchell Field, Wisconsin
 Moved to Truax Field, Wisconsin, 16 February 1951
 Re-assigned to Central Air Defense Force, 20 May 1951

133d Fighter-Interceptor Wing
 Federalized Minnesota Air National Guard, 10 February 1951
 Stationed at Holman Field, Minnesota
 Re-assigned to Central Air Defense Force 20 May 1951

142d Fighter-Interceptor Wing
 Federalized Oregon Air National Guard
 Stationed at Geiger Field, Washington
 Re-assigned to Eastern Air Defense Force from Western Air Defense Force (WADF), 11 April 1951
 Moved to O'Hare International Airport, Illinois, 1 May 1951
 Inactivated and returned to state control, 6 February 1952

551st Airborne Early Warning and Control Wing
 Stationed at Otis Air Force Base, Massachusetts
 Re-assigned to Eastern Air Defense Force from 8th Air Division (AEW&Con), 1 July 1957
 Re-assigned to 26th Air Division, 1 July 1959

4621st Air Defense Wing (SAGE)
 Stationed at McGuire Air Force Base, New Jersey
 Activated by Eastern Air Defense Force on 1 April 1956
 Re-assigned to 26th Air Division, 18 October 1956

4622d Air Defense Wing (SAGE)
 Stationed at Stewart Air Force Base, New York
 Activated by Eastern Air Defense Force on 1 June 1956
 Re-assigned to 26th Air Division, 18 October 1956

4706th Air Defense Wing
 Stationed at O'Hare International Airport, Illinois
 Activated by Eastern Air Defense Force on 1 February 1952
 Re-assigned to 30th Air Division, 16 February 1953

4708th Air Defense Wing
 Stationed at Selfridge Air Force Base, Michigan
 Activated by Eastern Air Defense Force on 1 February 1953
 Re-assigned to 30th Air Division, 16 February 1953

4709th Defense Wing
 Stationed at McGuire Air Force Base, New Jersey
 Activated by Eastern Air Defense Force on 1 February 1952
 Re-assigned to 26th Air Division, 16 February 1953

4710th Defense Wing
 Stationed at New Castle Air Force Base, Delaware
 Activated by Eastern Air Defense Force on 1 February 1952
 Re-assigned to 26th Air Division, 16 February 1953

4711th Defense Wing
 Stationed at Presque Isle Air Force Base, Maine
 Activated by Eastern Air Defense Force on 1 February 1952
 Re-assigned to 32d Air Division, 16 February 1953

Groups
152d Aircraft Control and Warning Group
 Federalized New Hampshire Air National Guard, 1 September 1951
 Stationed at Grenier Air Force Base, New Hampshire
 Assigned to Eastern Air Defense Force
 Re-assigned to 32d Air Division, 6 February 1952

156th Aircraft Control and Warning Group
 Federalized Michigan Air National Guard, 16 September 1951
 Stationed at Selfridge Air Force Base, Michigan
 Headquarters remained at Selfridge Air Force Base, personnel deployed to locations in the Chicago, Illinois area
 Inactivated and returned to state control, 6 February 1952

4700th Air Defense Group
 Stationed at Stewart Air Force Base, New York
 Re-assigned to Eastern Air Defense Force from Air Defense Command, 1 January 1951
 Re-assigned to 4709th Air Defense Wing, 20 September 1954

Squadron
614th Aircraft Control and Warning Squadron
 Stationed at: Grenier Air Force Base, New Hampshire. 1 July 1952-1 December 1952

See also
Central Air Defense Force
Western Air Defense Force

References 

Aerospace Defense Command, The Interceptor, January 1979, United States Air Force (Volume 21, Number 1)
Maurer, Maurer (1983). Air Force Combat Units Of World War II. Maxwell Air Force Base, Alabama: Office of Air Force History. 
Ravenstein, Charles A. (1984). Air Force Combat Wings Lineage and Honors Histories 1947–1977. Maxwell Air Force Base, Alabama: Office of Air Force History. 
A Handbook of Aerospace Defense Organization 1946 - 1980, by Lloyd H. Cornett and Mildred W. Johnson, Office of History, Aerospace Defense Center, Peterson Air Force Base, Colorado
Winkler, David F. (1997), Searching the skies: the legacy of the United States Cold War defense radar program. Prepared for United States Air Force Headquarters Air Combat Command.

Numbered air forces of the United States Air Force
Air defense units and formations of the United States Air Force
1949 establishments in New York (state)
1960 disestablishments in New York (state)
Military units and formations disestablished in 1960